Clifton Clagett (December 3, 1762 – January 25, 1829) was an American lawyer and politician from New Hampshire. He served as a member of the New Hampshire House of Representatives, the United States House of Representatives and as a New Hampshire Supreme Court justice.

Early life
Clagett was born in Portsmouth in the Province of New Hampshire, the son of Wyseman Clagett and Lettice (Mitchell) Clagettt. He was admitted to the bar and commenced practice in Litchfield, New Hampshire in 1787.

Political career
Elected as a Federalist candidate to the Eighth Congress, Clagett served as a United States Representative for the state of New Hampshire from March 4, 1803 – March 3, 1805. He was appointed a justice of the peace and quorum in 1808. In addition, he was appointed judge of probate for Hillsborough County, New Hampshire in 1810 and served until his resignation in 1812, having been appointed to another judicial position.

Clagett moved to Amherst, New Hampshire in 1812, and was appointed a judge of the New Hampshire Supreme Court in that year. He also served as a member of the New Hampshire House of Representatives in 1816. Elected as a Democratic-Republican to the Fifteenth Congress and reelected to the Sixteenth Congress, Clagett served as a United States Representative from (March 4, 1817 – March 3, 1821). After leaving Congress, he was appointed judge of probate on August 5, 1823, and held the office until his death.

Death
Clagett died in Amherst on January 25, 1829 (age 66 years, 53 days). He is interred at Meadow View Cemetery in Amherst, New Hampshire.

Family life
Married to Margaret McQueston, on November 19, 1834, Clagett had eleven children, Wyseman, William, Elizabeth, Margaretta, Cornelia Clifton, Susan, Frances G., Emma C., Harriet, Frances, and Lucretia.

References

External links

1762 births
1829 deaths
Politicians from Portsmouth, New Hampshire
People from Amherst, New Hampshire
New Hampshire lawyers
Justices of the New Hampshire Supreme Court
Members of the New Hampshire House of Representatives
People from Litchfield, New Hampshire
Federalist Party members of the United States House of Representatives
Democratic-Republican Party members of the United States House of Representatives from New Hampshire
New Hampshire Federalists
19th-century American lawyers